Poison Pen is the third studio album by Chino XL, an American hip hop musician. It was released on January 31, 2006. Fans anticipated this release ever since Chino XL's Poison Pen: The Lost Tapes, which featured the tracks "Beastin'", "Our Time", and "Wordsmith". Poison Pen was released as a 2-disc special collector's edition. Every copy was autographed by Chino XL with a silver "poison pen". The album was executive produced and A&R'd by Chino's then manager  Stacey Castro, who orchestrated guest appearances by her other clients, Proof of D-12, Wu-Tang Clan affiliate Killah Priest, and the Beatnuts.

Track listing

Disc one

Disc two
Disc two is a remixed version of the album by POWER 106's Mr. Choc. Sequencing is by JBoogie and SugaShack. It also includes descriptions of each track by Chino XL.

Bonus material
Aside from the Bonus Track "Nunca" at the end of "All I Wanna Do... (Bout Nuthin'), there are also bonus videos and links to unlock a special contest on the Poison Pen website.

Notes
The Song "Our Time (feat. Proof)" is also found on "Big Proof & Iron Fist present: Hand 2 Hand official Mixtape Instruction Manual" it is the song called "The Beats, The Rhymes" with Chino XL being featured.
"Skin" Features interpolations from the film Identity

References

2006 albums
Chino XL albums